The following is a list of notable deaths in November 1995.

Entries for each day are listed alphabetically by surname. A typical entry lists information in the following sequence:
 Name, age, country of citizenship at birth, subsequent country of citizenship (if applicable), reason for notability, cause of death (if known), and reference.

November 1995

1
Richard Ashcraft, 57, American political theorist.
Helen Bullock, 89-90, American historian.
Rocco Canale, 78, American football player in the NFL.
James Ralph Darling, 96, English-Australian chairman of ABC.
Lex Hixon, 53, American Sufi author, poet, and spiritual teacher, cancer.
Bill Hudson, 85, British Special Operations Executive officer.
Vasil Iljoski, 92, Macedonian writer and dramatist.
George McCowan, 68, Canadian film and television director, pulmonary emphysema.
Erika Morini, 91, Austrian violinist.
Alun Pask, 58, Welsh rugby player.
W. E. D. Ross, 82, Canadian writer.
Desmond Shawe-Taylor, 88, English music critic.
Brian Lenihan Snr, 64, Irish politician and minister.
Tom Spencer, 81, English cricket player and umpire.
Bradbury Thompson, 84, American graphic designer and art director.

2
Bill Blair, 84, American auto racer.
June Brewster, 82, American actress.
Florence Greenberg, 82, record company founder.
Luo Guibo, 88, Chinese diplomat and politician.
Ollie Harrington, 83, American cartoonist.
Álvaro Gómez Hurtado, 76, Columbian politician, homicide.
Gil Lamb, 91, American actor.
Gabriel Urgebadze, 66, Georgian Orthodox monk.

3
R. Tucker Abbott, 76, American conchologist and malacologist.
Bojan Adamič, 83, Slovenian composer.
Arthur Bottomley, 88, British Labour politician and minister.
Mario Revollo Bravo, 76, Colombian Catholic Cardinal and Archbishop.
Jerome Caja, 37, American mixed-media painter, drag queen, and performance artist, AIDS.
Wallas Eaton, 78, English film, radio, television and theatre actor.
Gordon S. Fahrni, 108, Canadian physician and president of the Canadian Medical Association.
John Orchard, 66, British actor (M*A*S*H).
Edward Pola, 88, American radio and TV producer, and lyricist.
William M. Rountree, 78, American diplomat, cancer.
Cordelia Urueta, 87, Mexican artist.
Isang Yun, 78, Korean-German composer.
Gojko Zec, 60, Serbian football manager, homicide.

4
John Cahill, 65, British businessman, and the chief executive of British Aerospace.
Marti Caine, 50, British comedienne, singer and television host, lymphatic cancer.
Revels Cayton, 87-88, American civil rights leader.
Gilles Deleuze, 70, French philosopher, suicide.
Paul Eddington, 68, English actor, lymphoma.
Eddie Egan, 65, American actor, cancer.
Essex Hemphill, 38, American poet and gay rights activist, AIDS-related complications.
Yizhak Rabin, 73, 5th Prime Minister of Israel, assassinated.
Morrie Schwartz, 78, American professor of sociology and author, ALS.
Prawitz Öberg, 64, Swedish football player, bone cancer.

5
Walter Dobler, 75, Canadian gridiron football player.
Gene Englund, 78, American basketball player.
Ernest Gellner, 69, British-Czech philosopher and social anthropologist.
Gordon Walters, 76, New Zealand artist and graphic designer.

6
Larry Cannon, 58, American racecar driver, embolism.
Bill Cheesbourg, 68, American racecar driver, cancer.
Aneta Corsaut, 62, American actress (The Blob, The Andy Griffith Show, Matlock), cancer.
Chiaki Matsuda, 99, Japanses admiral in the Imperial Japanese Navy during World War II.

7
Andrea Adams, 49, British broadcaster and journalist for the BBC, ovarian cancer.
Emery Bonett, 88, the pen name of Felicity Winifred Carter, an English author and playwright.
Dimitri Dimakopoulos, 66, Greek-Canadian architect.
Lars Dresler, 27, Danish figure skater and Olympian, undisclosed disease.
Ann Dunham, 52, American anthropologist, cancer.
John Patrick, 90, American screenwriter and playwright and winner of the Pulitzer Prize for Drama, suicide.
Slappy White, 74, American comedian and actor, heart attack.

8
Fernando Bello, 71, Portuguese sailor and Olympic medalist.
Neil Blaney, 73, Irish politician.
Suzanne Borel, 91, French diplomat.
Francis Cleveland, 92, American stage actor, director, producer, and son of president Grover Cleveland.
Oleh Makarov, 66, Soviet/Ukrainian football player, coach, and sports writer.
Gertrude Messinger, 84, American film actress, pneumonia.
Country Dick Montana, 40, singer, aneurysm.
Veselin Petrović, 66, Serbian cyclist.

9
Morley Baer, 79, American photographer and teacher.
Alessandro Cicognini, 89, Italian composer prolific in film music.
Robert O. Cook, 92, American sound engineer.
F. G. Emmison, 88, British archivist and historian.
Geraldine Katt, 75, Austrian actress.

10
Ria De Simone, 48, Italian actress and singer, brain cancer.
Clairmonte Depeiaza, 67, West Indian cricketer.
Jean Maurice Fiey, 81, French Dominican Father, Church historian and Syriacist.
Curly Fox, 85, American fiddler.
Ken Saro-Wiwa, 54, Nigerian writer and environmentalist, execution by hanging.
Franco Silva, 75, Italian actor.
René Wellek, 92, Czech-American writer.

11
Corneliu Coposu, 81, Romanian politician, lung cancer.
Jean-Louis Curtis, 78, French novelist.
Kenneth S. Goldstein, 68, American folklorist and enthomusicologist.
Koloman Gögh, 47, Czechoslovak football player, traffic collision.
Charles Scribner IV, 74, American publisher.

12
Richard L. Coe, 81, longtime theater and cinema critic for The Washington Post.
Roland Dobrushin, 66, Russian mathematician.
Emmett Matthew Hall, 97, Canadian jurist, judge, and civil liberties advocate.
Sir Robert Stephens, 64, English actor (The Private Life of Sherlock Holmes, Cleopatra, Empire of the Sun), complications following surgery.
Willie Telfer, 70, Scottish football player and manager.

13
Hanafy Bastan, 73, Egyptian footballer and Olympian.
Ralph Blane, 81, American songwriter, composer, lyricist, arranger, and singer.
Mary Elizabeth Counselman, 83, American writer of short stories and poetry.
Erdoğan Partener, 66, Turkish basketball player and Olympian.
Adriana Serra, 71, Italian film actress.
Orlando Sirola, 67, Italian tennis player.
Arthur Dale Trendall, 86, New Zealand-Australian art historian and classical archaeologist.
John Van Eyssen, 73, South African actor.

14
Jack Finney, 84, American author (The Body Snatchers), emphysema and pneumonia.
Jack Holt, 83, British sailboat designer.
Les Horvath, 74, American football quarterback and halfback.
John Lee-Barber, 90, British Royal Navy officer.
Jacob Rader Marcus, 99, American scholar and Reform rabbi.

15
Karen Berg, 89, Danish actress.
Joe F. Blair, 72, American sports publicist for the University of Maryland and the Washington Redskins.
Billy Hughes, 81, British educationist and Labour Party politician.
Sol Liptzin, 94, American-Israeli scholar, author, and professor of literature.
J. Clyde Mitchell, 77, British sociologist and anthropologist.
John W. Mitchell, 80, American Air Force officer and flying ace during World War II.

16
Robert H. Adleman, 76, American novelist and historian.
D. Woodrow Bird, 83, American politician.
Charles Gordone, 70, American playwright, actor, and director, liver cancer.
Ralph Kronig, 91, German physicist.
Conrad Lynn, 87, American civil rights lawyer and activist.
Petre Prličko, 88, Macedonian actor.
Gwyn A. Williams, 70, Welsh historian.

17
Agasi Babayan, 73, Armenian director, screenwriter, and actor.
Yevhen Bulanchyk, 73, Ukrainian hurdler who competed in the 1952 Summer Olympics.
Alan Hull, 50, English singer-songwriter (Lindisfarne), thrombosis.
Mohammad Said Keruak, 69, Malaysian politician.
Norman Kirkman, 75, English football player and manager.
Salvatore Martirano, 68, American composer.
Pete Welding, 60, American historian, archivist, and record producer, heart attack.
Marguerite Young, 87, American writer.

18
Francisco de Borbón y Borbón, 83, Spanish aristocrat and military officer.
John G. Collier, 60, British chemical engineer.
Jacques Ertaud, 71, French film director and screenwriter.
Miron Grindea, 86, Romanian-British literary journalist.
Mohammed Khaïr-Eddine, 54, Moroccan poet and writer.
Reinhard Kolldehoff, 81, German film actor.

19
Don Anielak, 65, American basketball player.
Charles Doe, 97, American rugby player.
Don Goldie, 65, American jazz trumpeter.
Wan Guchan, 95, Chinese filmmaker.
Martha Hill, 94, American modern dancer.
Ed Wright, 76, American baseball player, cancer.

20
George Burns, 76, New Zealand coxswain.
Lester Finch, 86, English football player and manager.
Robin Gandy, 76, British mathematician and logician.
Sergei Grinkov, 28, Russian figure skater and Olympic gold medalist, heart attack.
Robie Macauley, 76, American editor, novelist and critic.
Leotis Martin, 56, American boxer.
Martand Singh, 72, Indian wildlife conservationist and politician.
Kim Sung-jae, 23, South Korean singer, rapper, dancer, and model, murdered.

21
Matthew Ashman, 35, English guitarist, complications from diabetes.
Primrose Bordier, 66, French designer.
Bruno Gerussi, 67, Canadian actor (The Beachcombers), heart attack.
Peter Grant, 60, English rock band manager for The Yardbirds and Led Zeppelin, heart failure.
Dorothy Jeakins, 81, American costume designer (The Ten Commandments, The Sound of Music, Samson and Delilah), Oscar winner (1949, 1951, 1965).
Noel Jones, 54, British diplomat.
Leon Lishner, 82, American operatic bass baritone.
Leila Mourad, 77, Egyptian singer and actress.
George Ivan Smith, 80, Australian diplomat.
Wilfred White, 91, English equestrian and Olympic champion.

22
Leonardo Bercovici, 87, American screenwriter, film director and producer.
Margaret St. Clair, 84, American fantasy and science fiction writer.
Tom Clay, 66, American radio personality and disc jockey, lung cancer.
Edna Deane, 90, English ballroom dancer, choreographer and drama teacher.
Elinborg Lützen, 76, Danish graphic designer.
Norman Potter, 72, English cabinetmaker, designer and writer.
Maria Cumani Quasimodo, 87, Italian actress and dancer.
Sergey Stechkin, 75, Soviet/Russian mathematician.
Johnnie Tillmon, 69, American welfare rights activist.

23
John Frederick Collins, 76, American politician and Mayor of Boston, pneumonia.
Louis Malle, 63, French film director (Atlantic City, Elevator to the Gallows, My Dinner with Andre), lymphoma.
Bernard M. Oliver, 79, American scientist.
Dan Page, 65, American gridiron football player.
Einari Teräsvirta, 80, Finnish gymnast and Olympic Champion
Junior Walker, 64, American musician and recording artist, cancer.
Steven Wood, 34, Australian sprint and marathon canoeist, suicide.

24
Ivar Bjare, 52, Swedish luger who competed in the 1968 Winter Olympics.
John Craven, 79, American actor.
Dominic Ekandem, 78, Nigerian Roman Catholic cardinal.
Stuart Henry, 53, Scottish disc jockey, multiple sclerosis.
Leslie O'Brien, Baron O'Brien of Lothbury, 87, English peer and Governor of the Bank of England.
Jeffrey Lynn, 89, American actor (Four Daughters, A Letter to Three Wives, BUtterfield 8).
Malcolm Munthe, 85, British soldier, writer, and curator.
Eduard Ole, 97, Estonian painter.
Paul van de Rovaart, 91, Dutch field hockey player and Olympian.

25
Ángel Cappelletti, 67-68, Argentine philosopher and university professor.
Édouard Chabert, 92, French sailor who competed in the 1952 Summer Olympics.
Nikolai Drozdetsky, 38, Russian ice hockey player, diabetes.
Helge Hagerman, 85, Swedish actor and film producer.
Leif Juster, 85, Norwegian comedian, singer and actor.
Roger McKenzie, 24, English musician and DJ, heart problems.
Boris Rytsarev, 65, Soviet/Russian film director.
Erich Schellow, 80, German actor.
Richard G. Shoup, 71, American politician.
Léon Zitrone, 81, Russian-French journalist and television presenter, stroke.

26
Roberto Bachi, 86, Italian-Israeli statistician and demographer.
Sydney Dawson Bailey, 79, English author, pacifist, and expert on international affairs.
David Briggs, 51, American record producer, lung cancer.
Maurice Britt, 76, American football player, Medal of Honor recipient, and businessman.
Terri L. Jewell, 41, American author, poet and Black lesbian activist.
Toshia Mori, 83, Japanese actress, traffic collision.
Bengt Palmquist, 72, Swedish sailor and Olympian.
Shankar Dayal Singh, 57, Indian politician, cardiac arrest.
Sanae Takasugi, 77, Japanese actress.
Wim Thoelke, 68, German TV entertainer.
Charles Warrell, 106, English schoolteacher and creator of the I-Spy book series.

27
Giancarlo Baghetti, 60, Italian Formula One driver, cancer.
Simon Bailey, 40, British Anglican priest and writer, AIDS-related complications.
Martín Colmenarejo, 59, Spanish racing cyclist.
Albert Ouzoulias, 80, French communist leader of the French Resistance during World War II
Jürgen Wattenberg, 94, German U-boat commander and POW escapee during World War II.

28
Sukhan Babayev, 85, Soviet-Turkmenistan politician and General Secretary of the Communist Party of Turkmenistan.
Richard C. Halverson, 79, American Presbyterian minister and author.
Brunhilde Hendrix, 57, German relay runner and Olympic silver medalist.
Slobodan Ivković, 58, Serbian basketball player and coach.
Roy A. Taylor, 85, American politician.
David James Walker, 90, Canadian politician.

29
Tanaka Chikao, 90, Japanese playwright and dramatist.
Wu De, 82, Chinese communist revolutionary and politician.
Irene Ighodaro, 79, Sierra Leonean doctor and social reformer.
Anthony LaRette, 44, American rapist and serial killer, execution by lethal injection.
Leon McQuay, 45, American gridiron football player.
Roger Norman, 67, Swedish triple jumper.
Augusto H. Álvarez, 80, Mexican architect.

30
Niklaus Aeschbacher, 78, Swiss composer and conductor.
Jim Davis, 71, American baseball player.
June Fisher, 66, British teacher and trade unionist.
Philip Givens, 73, Canadian politician and judge.
Hopper Levett, 87, British cricket player.
Rafael Portillo, 79, Mexican film director, screenwriter and film editor.
William Roerick, 82, American actor, traffic collision.
Stretch, 27, American rapper, drive-by shooting, homicide.

References 

1995-11
 11